Phycomorpha escharitis is a moth in the family Copromorphidae. It was described by Edward Meyrick in 1916. It is found in Colombia.

References

Copromorphidae
Moths described in 1916